"Moo Moo" is the sixteenth episode of the fourth season of the American television police sitcom series Brooklyn Nine-Nine and the 84th overall episode of the series. The episode was written by Phil Augusta Jackson and directed by Maggie Carey. It aired on Fox in the United States on May 2, 2017. It features guest appearances from Desmond Harrington and Mary Holland.

The show revolves around the fictitious 99th precinct of the New York Police Department in Brooklyn and the officers and detectives that work in the precinct. In the episode, Terry experiences racial profiling when an officer nearly arrests him for wandering near his house at night. He then consults with Holt regarding the right thing to do. While Terry works to solve the problem, Jake and Amy babysit his daughters.

The episode was seen by an estimated 1.72 million household viewers and gained a 0.6/3 ratings share among adults aged 18–49, according to Nielsen Media Research. The episode received critical acclaim from audiences, who praised Terry Crews' performance, the subject matter, and for avoiding stereotypes against Terry Jeffords, with some deeming it as one of the best episodes in the series.

Plot
Terry (Terry Crews) decides to apply as a city council liaison for additional responsibilities. Having to stay and work on paperwork, he has Jake (Andy Samberg) and Amy (Melissa Fumero) pick up his daughters. During the trip, Cagney’s blanket, "Moo Moo", is accidentally thrown out of the car, forcing Terry to stop his car and head out into the night to find it.

After finding the blanket, Terry is subsequently stopped by Officer Maldack (Desmond Harrington), who snarls at him for daring to be outside at night and nearly arrests him, only backing off when Terry angrily identifies himself as a cop. While discussing with the uniformly shocked and angry precinct for experiencing racial profiling (even Hitchcock gets visibly furious at how Terry was treated), Terry decides to meet with Maldack. Maldack apologizes for nearly arresting him, but Terry angrily says that Maldack targeted him for being black and wants an apology, which Maldack refuses to give him. Terry decides to file a complaint and asks Holt (Andre Braugher) to submit it. To his surprise, Holt suggests that the complaint isn't the best idea. While babysitting Terry's daughters, Jake and Amy explain Terry's problem to them and have a discussion about being a minority in America.

When Terry is discussing the matter with Holt at the latter’s house, Holt explains that he does not want to submit a complaint against the officer on the matter, since the potential fallout from doing so could lead to negative consequences for Terry's future. Terry then explains to Holt that as an overweight child, a cop saved him from bullies, and the gratitude and respect he felt for the cops was the exact opposite of how Maldack made him feel. Holt then decides to support Terry's idea to submit the complaint. The next day, Holt tells Terry that his application for the liaison job was denied, most likely due to reporting the incident but Terry still feels good about doing the right thing.

Reception

Viewers
In its original American broadcast, "Moo Moo" was seen by an estimated 1.72 million household viewers and gained a 0.6/3 ratings share among adults aged 18–49, according to Nielsen Media Research. This was slight decrease in viewership from the previous episode, which was watched by 1.88 million viewers with a 0.7/3 in the 18-49 demographics. This means that 0.6 percent of all households with televisions watched the episode, while 3 percent of all households watching television at that time watched it. With these ratings, Brooklyn Nine-Nine was the third highest rated show on FOX for the night, behind The Mick and Prison Break, seventh on its timeslot and sixteenth for the night, behind two episodes of Great News, The Mick, Agents of S.H.I.E.L.D., Imaginary Mary, Prison Break, The Flash, The Real O'Neals, NCIS: New Orleans, American Housewife, The Middle, Bull, Chicago Fire, NCIS, and The Voice.

Critical reviews
"Moo Moo" received critical acclaim from critics. LaToya Ferguson of The A.V. Club gave the episode a "B" grade and  wrote, "After last week's hilarious faux goodbye to the Nine-Nine, the possibilities were endless for where Brooklyn Nine-Nine could go. I can't personally say an episode about police profiling against one of the Nine-Nine's own is where I thought the show would immediately go—especially not with the episode title 'Moo Moo' —but it's quite a way for the show to kick off May sweeps and get the Nine-Nine back in the groove after weeks of worrying about closing up shop."

Alan Sepinwall of Uproxx wrote, "Fortunately, the serious half of 'Moo Moo' felt honest and real without undercutting the show's usual goofiness, and it felt like a good way to take advantage of both the inclusiveness of the cast — if Terry Crews was the only [Black] regular on the show, this story plays very differently — and the varied skill sets of the ensemble." Andy Crump of Paste gave the episode a 9.3 and wrote, "That doesn't change in 'Moo Moo,' really, but 'Moo Moo' is, perhaps, the fourth season's best beneficiary to date of Brooklyn Nine-Nines longstanding character developments: Here, the amount of time we've spent investing in its cast pays off with astronomic results, even if there aren't many belly laughs included in those results. Maybe the idea of reduced funny stuff in Brooklyn Nine-Nine is anathema to you."

References

External links

2017 American television episodes
Brooklyn Nine-Nine (season 4) episodes
Television episodes about racism
Offender profiling
Black Lives Matter art